George William Hamstead (born 24 January 1946) is an English former professional footballer who played as a winger in the Football League for York City, Barnsley, Bury and Rochdale and was on the books of Rotherham United without making a league appearance. He served as reserve team coach at Bury after retiring from playing.

References

1946 births
Living people
Footballers from Rotherham
English footballers
Association football wingers
Rotherham United F.C. players
York City F.C. players
Barnsley F.C. players
Bury F.C. players
Rochdale A.F.C. players
English Football League players
Bury F.C. non-playing staff